It Would Be You is the second studio album by American country music singer Gary Allan. It was released on May 19, 1998, as his last studio album for the Decca Records Nashville label. After that album's release, Decca Records Nashville closed, so Gary Allan signed contracts with MCA Records Nashville. The album produced three singles with the title track, "No Man in His Wrong Heart", and "I'll Take Today". The title track was Allan's second Top 10 hit on the U.S. Billboard Hot Country Songs chart at number 7.

Content
"No Judgement Day", the final track on this album, is a hidden track. Written by Allen Shamblin, this song is based on the true story of a restaurant owner in Texas who was murdered by a former employee and two accomplices in search of money.

Just like Allan's previous album, several songs on this album were originally recorded by other artists. "Don't Leave Her Lonely Too Long" was written by Marty Stuart, whose original recording (from his 1990 album Hillbilly Rock) was a number 42 hit on the country charts in 1989. "She Loves Me (She Don't Love You)" was originally recorded by Conway Twitty, and later by George Strait on his 1990 album Livin' It Up. In addition, the single "I'll Take Today" was originally recorded by Tanya Tucker on her 1994 album Fire to Fire, and by Ty England on his 1996 album Two Ways to Fall. "Forgotten but Not Gone" was originally a single for Keith Palmer in 1991.

Track listing

Personnel
Gary Allan - lead vocals
Chad Cromwell - drums
Dan Dugmore - steel guitar
Glen Duncan - fiddle
Paul Franklin - steel guitar
Jake Holder - electric guitar solo
John Barlow Jarvis - Hammond organ, piano
Jake Kelly - acoustic guitar
B. James Lowry - 9-string acoustic guitar, acoustic guitar
Steve Nathan - Hammond organ, piano, synthesizer, Wurlitzer
Michael Rhodes - bass guitar
Tom Roady - percussion
Brent Rowan - electric guitar, tic tac bass
Rivers Rutherford - acoustic guitar
John Wesley Ryles - background vocals 
Hank Singer - fiddle
Harry Stinson - background vocals
Dennis Wilson - background vocals
Curtis Young - background vocals

Charts

References

1998 albums
Gary Allan albums
Decca Records albums
Albums produced by Byron Hill
Albums produced by Mark Wright (record producer)